Thomas Johnson is a British sound engineer. He has won two Academy Awards for Best Sound and has been nominated for seven more in the same category. He has worked on more than 125 films since 1983.

Selected filmography
Johnson has won two Academy Awards for Best Sound and has been nominated for another seven:

Won
 Terminator 2: Judgment Day (1991)
 Titanic (1997)

Nominated
 Forrest Gump (1994)
 Contact (1997)
 Star Wars: Episode I – The Phantom Menace (1999)
 Cast Away (2000)
 The Polar Express (2004)
 War Horse (2011)
 Ad Astra (2019)

References

External links
 

Year of birth missing (living people)
Living people
British audio engineers
Best Sound Mixing Academy Award winners
Best Sound BAFTA Award winners
Walt Disney Animation Studios people